Sanaa Shalan is a Jordanian contemporary writer, from the Arab novelty generation.  She writes novels, short stories, theater, scenario and children's literature. She holds a doctorate degree in modern literature. Shalan works as an instructor at the University of Jordan.

She is of Palestinian origins. Her family came from Bayt Nattif village of the Hebron district (alKhalil).

She is one of the most successful sixty Arab women for the year 2008, according to a poll conducted by Sayidaty. She obtained the peace star for the year 2014 from the Peace and Friendship International Organization. She is a critic and journalist for Arabic magazines, an activist in the issues of human rights, women, childhood and social justice. She is a member in many literary forums. She obtained many local, Arab and international awards in the fields of novels, short stories, theater, children's literature and scientific research.

She has written many plays that were published, performed and that won prizes.

She earned the shield of distinguished university teacher from University of Jordan in of 2007 and 2008. She earned the shield of distinguished academic and creative student in 2005.

She has many contributions in local, Arab and International conferences related to literature, criticism, heritage, human rights and environment. She is a member of its scientific arbitration and information committees. She is a representative of institutions, cultural and legal organizations and a partner in Arab cultural projects.

Early life
Sanaa Shalan was born in the “Sweileh” district of Amman. She is the first of 12 brothers and sisters. She received her bachelor's degree in Arabic language and literature from Al Yarmouk University in 1998, her master's degree in Modern Literature from Jordan University in 2003 and her PhD in Arabic Language from the same university in 2006.

Career
She was appointed as a faculty member of the University of Jordan.

She has worked as a visiting professor and guest lecturer at universities including, Mustapha Stambouli University in Algeria, Istanbul University in Turkey, Prince Hussein bin Abdullah the second Academy for civil protection in Jordan, Middle Eastern University in Jordan, Jawaharlal Nehru University in India, Jamia Millia Islamia University in India, Kalkuta University in India, Joulalonkorn University in Thailand, California University in the US, Trist University in Italy, Al-alBait University in Jordan, and the International Council.

Journalist 
She worked as a reporter for multiple periodicals, including Al-Jasrah cultural magazine in Qatar, and Al-Nojoum, Al-Anwar and Telegraph in Sydney, Australia.

She has a weekly column published in multiple newspapers, including Al-Dustour, Abaad Motawasitiya and Al-Rai'd, Asdaa and Al-Hikmah,  the Telegraph (Sydney, Australia), and the Haq-al Awdah, Al-Nass website, Al-Ittihad and Al-Najah.

Organizations 
She is a member of many organizations:
 Association of Jordanian Writers
 Union of Arab Writers
 Future Writers Family/ Ammon Forum for Literature and Criticism
 Al-Karak Cultural Forum
 Dar Naji Naaman of Culture
 Mediterranean Center for Studies and Research
 Association of Arab Translators and Linguists
 Editorial Board of Difaf al-Dijlatayn
 International Institute for Women Solidarity
 Association of Jordanian Critics
 Arab Literary Association
 Arab Culture Portal
 Association of Egyptian Translators and Linguists
 Association of independent humanitarian lights
 World Press Council
 Advisory Council of the Educational Society Magazine,
 Jordanian-Palestinian brotherhood Association
 Editorial Board of "Mirrors of the Diaspora / Maraya min al mahjar"
 Advisory Council in Al-Jasra Cultural Journal
 Scientific Council of the Maghreb Literary Forum
 Department of Arabic Literature - University of Skikdah, Algeria
 Organization of Books without Borders
 International Preparatory Committee for the first conference of the Deans of graduate studies and scientific research of the Union of Arab Universities
 Al-Aqsa University in Gaza in cooperation with the Arab Council for graduate studies and scientific research of the Union of Arab Universities
 Association of Iraqi Writers in Australia
 Advisory Council in the Arabic Journal of Quality
 Best Practices and Excellence
 Scientific and Media Advisory Committee for the Al-Manar Cultural Satellite Journal
 Media Committee for the second international Jordanian Francophone conference at Al-alBait University in Jordan entitled " Reception of Thousand and One Nights in the Humanities of the World "
 Council of the regional forum for media, center for rehabilitation and freedom of press and its official coordinator in Jordan
 Editor of the "no boundaries" organization of the Writers Without Borders Organization Dar Arab-Iraqi story
 Scientific committee of the second international forum "the novel’s sociology in the light of contemporary critical approaches" for the year 2013
 Zian Jilfah University, Algeria, scientific committee of the first national forum on “The Algerian Novel in the light of contemporary critical approaches"
 “Eternal River” Literary Association, scientific advisory body in the magazine "lectures/ Qiraat",  published by the faculty of Letters and Languages, Muaskar University, Algeria
 Arab Senior Critics Council, International Delegate “The International Organization for Peace and Friendship (Denmark)”
 Council of Arab writers and intellectuals
 Director of the Amman / Jordan Branch of the World Organization for Human Rights, Sydney, Australia)
 Editor-in-Chief of the magazine "Wojhat" published by the Millitan Foundation for research, studies, and cultural development
 Honorary member of the Tabouk Creators Association
 Member of the editorial board of the international journal Multicultural Echoes Literary Magazine 
 Member of the consultative committee of the Journal of Iraqi Scientific Thesis
 Member of the international advisory committee  in the Journal of the Arab-Indian Scientific Forum
 Member of the advisory board of the Arab magazine of Quality, Best Practices and Excellence
 Member of the advisory committee of the e-magazine Al-Masdar 
 Member of the editorial board of the journal Awraq
 Official coordinator in Jordan of the Center for the Rehabilitation and Protection of Civil Liberties and the Press 
 Vice-chairman of the board of directors of Rai Al Umma and the director of the arts and literature department and a newspaper editor 
 Representative of the “Golden Desert Foundation” foundation
 Official coordinator in Jordan of the Center for the Rehabilitation and Protection of Press Liberties
 Director of the “Writers Without Borders” branch in Jordan
 Director of Dar al-Qisa al-Arabiya al-Iraqiya in Jordan
 Director of the International Phoenix Gold festival committee in Jordan
 General secretary of Al-Warraq publishing and distribution award for 2009
 Head of the cultural section of Karam News Agency
 Representative of the Literary Association "Lost River" and Director of  its Amman office,
 Consultant for the group "Haiatak Thommona" an initiative launched by "the prosperous future" group in 2014
 Representative of the International Women's Organization in Jordan

Works
She has 52 published works, including specialized critical books, novels, short stories, children's stories in addition to hundreds of published articles and researches; as well as columns in many newspapers, and in Arab and local periodicals. Her works have been translated into several languages, and she has had many honors, shields, honorary titles, and cultural, social and legal representations.
 A Monster Called Homeland–a joint collection of stories with Palestinian creators, translated into Bulgarian, 2016
 The Convoy of Thirst, a collection of stories, translated into Bulgarian, 2014, translated into English, 2016
 An Event With a Wall, a collection of stories, 2016
 He Who Stole a Star, a collection of stories, 2016
 The Palestinian Takasim, a collection of stories, 2016
 Stars of the Free Pen, a joint collection of stories with Arabic writers, 2015
 Creators, a joint collection of stories with Arabic writers, 2015
 Year of the Ants, a collection of stories, 2014
 From the Speaking Womb of the Desert: short stories from Jordan, a joint collection of stories with Jordanian writers, translated into English, 2013
 The story in Jordan, texts and studies, a joint collection of stories with Jordanian writers, 2013
 Lost in the Eyes of the Mount Man, a collection of stories, 2012
 Adore Me, novel, 2012
 The Water Hymns, a collection of stories, 2010
 In Love, a joint collection of stories with Arabic writers, 2009
 A Letter to the God, a collection of stories, 2009
 Selections from the Jordanian short stories, a joint collection of stories with Jordanian writers, 2008
 The Land of Tales, a collection of stories, 2006
 Denominators of combustion, a collection of stories, 2006
 The Silo Hermit, a collection of stories, 2006
 The Nightmare, a collection of stories, 2006
 Infant diaries, a collection of stories, 2006
 The Glass Wall, a collection of stories, 2005
 The Fall in the Sun, novel, 2004
 Zeriab, the People Teacher and Magnanimity, a children story, 2008
 Haroun al-Rasheed, the Worshiper Fighter Caliph, a children story, 2008
 Al-Khalil Bin Ahmed Al-Farfahidi, Father of Arabic poetry and grammar, children story, 2008
 Ibn Taimiah, the Islamic Sheikh, and Sunna reviver, a children story, 2008
 Al-Laith Bin Sa'd, the giver Imam, a children story, 2008
 Al-Ez Bin Abdul-Salam, scientist's sultan, and kings’ seller, a children story, 2007
 The owner of a Golden Heart, a children story, 2007.

Theatrical writings 
Sanaa  Shalan has many theatrical works, such as It is said 2009. This play was presented by the Al-Mokhtaber group at the university theatre at Hashemite University in Jordan. It was directed by Jordanian director, Abed-al-Samad al-Bsoul, and it was presented at the ninth Philadelphia festival for the Arab theatre. It won the award of best theatrical text. She wrote 6 In the Basement in 2006, Issa Bin Hisham, another time in 2002, The perfect bride in 2002, The happy prince in 2002, An invitation to dinner Looking for a strawberry one face for two rainy, Invitation in honor of the red colour, The trial of the name X. She wrote pieces for children, such as: Children in the World of Dreams, Today Comes the Feast, and The Sultan Do Not Sleep.

Recognition
She has received many awards:
 Award of Haifa' al-Salous for monodrama, theatrical writing, the monodrama text, 2015
 The International Prize for Culture and Publishing "Zahmat Kitab", short history, 2015
 Prize for best journalist in the newspaper Rai Al Ummah, 2015
 Salah Hilal Literary Award for Short Story in its 14th session, short story 2015
 Festival of the free pen for Arab creativity, short story, 2015
 International Sparkle, sparkle story, The Sparkles Stories", 2014
 Martyr Abdul Raouf Annual literary award, "Day of the Martyr", theatrical composition, 2014
 Al-Nasir Ayoubi Salah Aldeen
 Mohammad Tomaileh award, short story, 2014
 Most beautiful book, 2014
 "50 most influential figures in Jordan", ranked 19th, 2013
 Golden Phoenix Award for Outstanding Women, 2013
 Arab Woman conference, 2012
 “Writers without Boundaries”,  2012
 The Claus award for creativity, 2012
 Dubai award for cultural creativity in its 7th session, 2010/2011
 Ahmed Bozfor award for short stories, 2011
 Miibar al-Madik, short story, 2011
 University of Philadelphia, Arab academic theater, theatrical text, 2010
 Sheikh Mohammed Saleh Bashraheel Award for International Cultural Creativity, novel and short story
 A. M. Qattan Foundation, theater, 2009
 The eighth Bsaira award "The revolution martyrs", short story, 2009
 Saqiyat AlSawi for creativity, short story, 2009
 Love literature for Sphinx agency, 2009
 Sharhabil Bin Hasnah, 2008
 Jeddah society for culture and arts in theater, 2008
 Cultural features, story collection, 2008
 Bism Hobbi Lak, best love letter, 2008
 Al Hareth bin Omair Al Azadi Award" for creativity, short history, 2007
 Al Nahyan Prize for children's literature, history, 2007
 Hashemite University, theatrical text, 2007
 Al-Nasir Salah Al-Deen, theatrical text, 2006
 Anti-fire, story, 2006
 Al-Shariqah award for Arab creativity, short story, 2006
 Dar Naji Nu'man award for culture, child biography, 2006
 First place award of the University of Jordan, "Theatrical Character of the University", best theatrical scenario, 2006
 Saqiat al-Sawi short story award, 2006
 Al-Bajrawah award for best scientific research, 2005
 Shield of the President of the University of Jordan for distinguished student academically and creatively, 2005
 Al-Nasir Salah al-Deen al-Ayoubi award, short story, 2005
 Dr Suad al-Sabah award, short story, 2005
 Jordanian state award for youth creativity, short story, 2005
 Jordanian Universities story teller award, 2005
 University of Jordan Cultural Competition award, 2005
 Al-Nasir Salah al-Deen al-Ayoubi, novel, 2005
 Future writers in the story, 2005
 University of Jordan, theatrical writing, 2005
 Motah University short story award, 2004

References

External links
http://eacademic.ju.edu.jo/s.shaalan/default.aspx
http://eacademic.ju.edu.jo/s.shaalan/_layouts/mobile/mblwp.aspx?Url=%2Fs%2Eshaalan%2Fdefault%2Easpx
http://nina-iraq.com/2014/09/16/novelist-dr-sanaa-al-shalan-enjoys-a-prize-bonanza/
http://www.doctorlife.tv/fr/support/full/128.html
http://www.alapn.com/en/save.php?typ=1&newsid=1114

Year of birth missing (living people)
Living people
Jordanian journalists
Jordanian women journalists
Jordanian literary critics
Jordanian novelists
Jordanian women novelists
Jordanian translators